John De Andrea (born November 24, 1941) is an American sculptor known for his realistic sculptures of human figures, dressed or nude and in true-to-life postures.

Life 
De Andrea was born in Denver, Colorado, on November 24, 1941. He received his Bachelor of Fine Arts from the University of Colorado at Boulder and studied at the University of New Mexico in Albuquerque on an art scholarship, 1966–8. He lives in Denver.

Work and themes 

De Andrea is an artistic representative of Hyperrealism and the Hyperrealism school of art, and specializes in nudes, frequently lovers, which he makes from plastic, polyester, glass fiber with natural hair and painted after naturalistic gypsum castings. His work is often associated with that of Duane Hanson and George Segal.

In documenta 5 in Kassel 1972, he presented Arden Andersen and Nora Murphy, a hyper-realistic sculpture of a couple in the act of love-making, made from bodycasts rendered in polyester resin.

This alienation between the lovers and their incurable misfortune becomes even clearer with his 1978 work on display in Aachen, entitled The Couple. The man is not only fully dressed and the woman naked, but she clings to him, while he touches her only minimally, in order to not induce an open rejection.

De Andrea's works based on the sculptor and his model are characterized by a sober, professional relationship between the man and the woman; the artist concentrates on his work or rather is shown in situations, where he withdraws within himself to a meditative posture, and retreats into himself, in order to collect his energy and concentration for further work.

Collections
De Andrea's work is included in the numerous permanent collections, including:
 the Metropolitan Museum of Art,
 the Museum Ludwig in Aachen and Cologne, Germany.
 the Portland Museum of Art,
 the Herbert F. Johnson Museum of Art, and
 the Denver Art Museum.

See also
Duane Hanson
Ron Mueck
George Segal

References

External links
John de Andrea. Sphinx. 1987. Polyvinyl, oil paint: life-size. East Tennessee State University

1941 births
Living people
Artists from Denver
University of Colorado Boulder alumni
University of New Mexico alumni
Hyperrealist artists
Sculptors from Colorado